Table tennis at the 2011 All-Africa Games in Maputo, Mozambique was held on September 3–13, 2011.

Medal summary

Medal table

References

External links
Results & News on ittf.com

2011 All-Africa Games
All-Africa Games
Table tennis at the African Games